Caldonazzo is a commune in Valsugana, in Trentino, northern Italy.

The nearby Lake of Caldonazzo is the source of the Brenta River.

References

External links
 Official website 

Cities and towns in Trentino-Alto Adige/Südtirol
Municipalities of Trentino